Tenellia puellula is a species of sea slug, an aeolid nudibranch, a marine gastropod mollusc in the family Fionidae.

Distribution
This species was described from Japan. It has been reported from the Japan Sea coast at Echizen Coast, Fukui Prefecture, north-west coast of Honshu and from the Pacific Ocean coast at Hachijo Island. Similar looking animals have been found at Mooloolaba, Sunshine Coast, Queensland, Australia.

References 

Fionidae
Gastropods described in 1955